Pyrgulina tenerrima is a species of sea snail, a marine gastropod mollusk in the family Pyramidellidae, the pyrams and their allies.

Distribution
This marine species occurs off Vietnam and in the Persian Gulf; also off the Solomon Islands.

References

 Thiele J. (1925). Gastropoden der Deutschen Tiefsee-Expedition. II Teil. Wissenschaftliche Ergebnisse der Deutschen Tiefsee-Expedition auf dem Dampfer "Valdivia" 1898-1899. 17(2): 35-382, pls 13-46 
 Saurin, E. 1962. Pyramidellidae du Golfe de Thailande. Annales de la Faculté des Sciences (Saigon) 1961: 231-266, pls. 1-5.
 Peñas A. & Rolán E. (2017). Deep water Pyramidelloidea from the central and South Pacific. The tribe Chrysallidini. ECIMAT (Estación de Ciencias Mariñas de Toralla), Universidade de Vigo. 412 pp.

External links
 To World Register of Marine Species
 Melvill, J. C. (1906). Descriptions of thirty-one Gastropoda and one scaphopod from the Persian Gulf and Gulf of Oman, dredged by Mr. F.W. Townsend, 1902-1904. Proceedings of the Malacological Society of London. 7(2): 69-80, pls 7-8
 Melvill, J. C. (1910). A revision of the species of the family Pyramidellidae occurring in the Persian Gulf, Gulf of Oman and North Arabian Sea, as exemplified mostly in the collections made by Mr. F.W. Townsend (1893-1900), with descriptions of new species. iProceedings of the Malacological Society of London. 9: 171-207, pls 4-6.
 Saurin, E. 1959. Pyramidellidae de Nhatrang (Vietnam). Annales de la Faculté des Sciences (Saigon) 1959: 223-283, pls. 1-9

Pyramidellidae
Gastropods described in 1906